The United States Naval Academy is an undergraduate college in Annapolis, Maryland with the mission of educating and commissioning officers for the United States Navy and Marine Corps. The Academy is often referred to as Annapolis, while sports media refer to the Academy as "Navy" and the students as "Midshipmen"; this usage is officially endorsed. During the latter half of the 19th century and the first decades of the 20th, the United States Naval Academy was the primary source of U.S. Navy and Marine Corps officers, with the Class of 1881 being the first to provide officers to the Marine Corps. Graduates of the Academy are also given the option of entering the United States Army or United States Air Force. Most Midshipmen are admitted through the congressional appointment system. The curriculum emphasizes various fields of engineering.

This list is drawn from alumni of the Naval Academy who are recipients of the Medal of Honor (MOH), the highest military decoration awarded by the United States government. The Academy was founded in 1845 and graduated its first class in 1846. The first alumnus to graduate and go on to receive the Medal of Honor was Harry L. Hawthorne (class of 1882). The most recent alumnus to receive the Medal of Honor was James Stockdale (class of 1947). Two alumni, Orion P. Howe (class of 1870) and Henry Lakin Simpson (class of 1882), received the Medal of Honor before being appointed to the Academy.

At the Naval Academy, in Bancroft Hall, twenty-one rooms are dedicated to each Academy graduate Medal of Honor recipient since the start of World War II.

In addition to the 73 Medal of Honor recipients who are alumni of the Academy, over 990 noted scholars from a variety of academic fields are Academy graduates, including 45 Rhodes Scholars and 16 Marshall Scholars. Additional notable graduates include 1 President of the United States and 2 Nobel Prize recipients.

Medal of Honor recipients
"Class year" refers to the alumni's class year, which usually is the same year they graduated. However, in times of war, classes often graduate early. For example, the Class of 1943 actually graduated in 1942.

Spanish–American War

Veracruz

World War I

World War II

Korea

Vietnam

Other recipients

See also
United States Naval Academy Cemetery#Medal of Honor recipients
List of Medal of Honor recipients
Medal of Honor Memorial

References

General

Inline citations

United States Naval
Medal of Honor

 
United States Naval Academy